Designated as a "DL721" by ALCO, the 2,000 hp RS-32 was intended to compete with EMD's GP20 and GE's U25B locomotives. Only 35 units were produced, with 25 units ordered by New York Central in 1961 and 10 units by Southern Pacific in 1962. New York Central’s RS-32s were commonly seen in both road and local freight assignments. Southern Pacific's units were initially used in road service, but later settled into local freight service in San Francisco's "commute" territory. Here they were sometimes called upon to rescue stalled commuter trains. They later migrated across the system, ending their SP careers in Texas during the late 1970s with various other ALCo models.

Original owners

Surviving RS32s

See also 
 List of ALCO diesel locomotives

References

External links

 Sarberenyi, Robert. Alco RS32 and RS36 Original Owners.

B-B locomotives
RS32
Diesel-electric locomotives of the United States
Railway locomotives introduced in 1961
Freight locomotives
Standard gauge locomotives of the United States